Bedrock 3 is an album by Uri Caine with Tim Lefebvre and Zach Danziger which was released on the Winter & Winter label in 2001.

Reception

In his review for Allmusic, David R. Adler notes that "a jazz/hip-hop hybrid with a personal and accessible avant-garde thrust. Hip, spacy, and sometimes dark, the music also has its tongue-in-cheek aspects". On All About Jazz Phil DiPietro said "Frankly, outside of Herbie's recorded output, I can't come up with a recording of electric piano, bass and drums that so thoroughly throws down in so complex, yet so tight, yet so accessible fashion as this one".

Track listing
All compositions by Uri Caine, Tim Lefebvre & Zach Danziger
 "Our Hour" – 8:52  
 "Nymphomania" – 6:35  
 "Fang" – 5:54  
 "Skins" – 2:22  
 "Humphrey Pass My Way" – 6:28  
 "Flagrant Fragrant" – 5:06  
 "Toe Jam" – 3:52  
 "Red Eye" – 2:42  
 "Lobby Daze" – 7:36  
 "J. Edgar Hoover in a Dress" – 4:37  
 "Root Canal" – 6:08

Personnel
Uri Caine – Fender Rhodes piano
Tim Lefebvre – bass
Zach Danziger – drums
DJ Logic – turntables (tracks 8 & 11) 
Jessie System (track 9), Pete Davenport (track 11) – vocals

References

Winter & Winter Records albums
Uri Caine albums
2001 albums